Titus Aurelius Fulvus may refer to: 
 Titus Aurelius Fulvus (grandfather of Antoninus Pius)
 Titus Aurelius Fulvus (father of Antoninus Pius)
 Titus Aurelius Fulvus Boionius Arrius Antoninus, emperor as Antoninus Pius